The 14th Producers Guild of America Awards (also known as 2003 Producers Guild Awards), honoring the best film and television producers of 2002, were held at The Century Plaza Hotel in Los Angeles, California on March 2, 2003. The ceremony was hosted by Patricia Heaton. The nominees were announced on January 16, 2003.

Winners and nominees

Film
{| class=wikitable style="width="100%"
|-
! colspan="2" style="background:#abcdef;"| Darryl F. Zanuck Award for Outstanding Producer of Theatrical Motion Pictures
|-
| colspan="2" style="vertical-align:top;"|
 Chicago – Martin Richards Adaptation – Edward Saxon, Jonathan Demme, and Vincent Landay
 Gangs of New York – Alberto Grimaldi and Harvey Weinstein
 The Lord of the Rings: The Two Towers – Barrie M. Osborne, Peter Jackson, and Fran Walsh
 My Big Fat Greek Wedding – Rita Wilson, Tom Hanks, and Gary Goetzman
 Road to Perdition – Richard D. Zanuck and Dean Zanuck
|}

Television

David O. Selznick Lifetime Achievement Award in Theatrical Motion PicturesRobert EvansDavid Susskind Lifetime Achievement Award in TelevisionBud YorkinMilestone AwardJack ValentiStanley Kramer AwardTodd Black and Denzel Washington for Antwone Fisher

Vanguard Award
George Lucas

Visionary Award
Rita Wilson for My Big Fat Greek Wedding

References

2002 film awards
2002 television awards
 2002
Producers Guild Awards
2002 guild awards